The Distinguished Order of Meritorious Service is a Malaysian federal award presented for meritorious service to the country.

It should not be confused with the Order of Merit.

About the award
The order has one rank: Commander.

Commander

Commander of the Order of Meritorious Service (P.J.N.).

The award recipient receives the title Datuk and his wife Datin. 

This rank is limited to 200 living recipients at any time, excepting foreign citizens who are conferred honorary awards.

Recipients

Commanders (P.J.N.)
The Commanders receives the title Datuk and his wife Datin.

Honorary Recipients

Honorary Commanders
The Honorary Commanders also receives the title Datuk and his wife Datin.
 1996: Eduardo Alberto Sadous
 1996: Lin Cheng Yuan
 1997: Takeshi Furuta
 1997: Yoichi Morishita
 1998: Chao Ting Tsung
 1998: Jean-Claude Paye
 1998: Mihaela Y. Smith
 1998: Norio Ohga
 1998: Yoshiko Y. Nakano
 1999: Yugi Kawata
 2000: Datuk Laksamana TNI-AL Achmad Sutjipto
 2000: Datuk Seri Kolonel Md. Jaafar bin Haji Abdul Aziz
 2000: Datuk Peter Jenkins
 2001: Edgar E. Nordman
 2001: John F. Coyne
 2001: Narongvich Thaitong
 2002: Jeffery Sandragesan
 2003: Eiro Sakamoto
 2003: Elihu Lauterpacht
 2003: James Richard Crawford
 2003: Nicholas Zefferys
 2003: Nicolaas Jan Schrijver
 2003: Peter Michael Wentworth
 2003: Timothy Garland
 2003: Yoshihiro Uehara
 2003: Yukio Shohtoku
 2004: Ernest Ziegler Bower IV
 2004: Helmut Baur
 2004: Jurgen Heiderman
 2004: Kunio Nakamura
 2004: Manuel Condeminas
 2004: Nurset Arsel
 2004: Omar Muhieddine Jundi
 2004: Thomas Anthonius Haziroglou
 2005: A.K.M. Shahidul Islam
 2005: Husamettin Sinlak
 2005: Issei Nomura
 2005: Park Myung Jae
 2005: Winai Phattiyakul
 2007: Colin Campbell
 2007: Des Alwi Abu Bakar
 2007: Donald Eugene Blake
 2007: James Chao Yuan Hsiu
 2007: Richard Leete
 2007: Samir Alkour
 2008: Tristan Beauchamp Russell
 2009: Eric Tan
 2009: Peter Richard Brokenshire
 2009: Syed Ahmad bin Alwee Alsree
 2010: Gories Mere
 2010: Imhoff Andreas Balthasar
 2010: Kirinde Dhammaratena Thero
 2010: Kwek Len San
 2010: Rifaat Ahmed Abdel Karim
 2010: Russell Walker Strong
 2011: Evelyn Genta
 2011: George Che-Ching Wang
 2011: Ghanim Saad M Alsaad Al-Kuwari
 2011: Hassan bin Salleh
 2011: Ikbal Abouelkacem Abbassi
 2011: Noureddine Ayed
 2011: Tritot Ronnaritivichai
 2012: Khadem Abdulla Al Qubaisi
 2012: Mark James Stewart
 2012: Takashi Hibi
 2013: Peter Robert Vogt
 2014: Saridchai Anakevieng
 2017: Marcus Levon Karakashian
 2017: Shigeharu Toda

References

External links
 Malaysia: Order of Distinguished Service

 
Meritorious Service
Awards established in 1995
1995 establishments in Malaysia